Kucherbayevo (Küsärbay) is a rural locality (a village) in Ryazanovsky Selsoviet, Sterlitamaksky District, Bashkortostan, Russia. The population was 332 as of 2010. There are 3 streets.

Geography 
Kucherbayevo is located 20 km northwest of Sterlitamak (the district's administrative centre) by road. Yeslevsky is the nearest rural locality.

References 

Rural localities in Sterlitamaksky District